ASTM A500 is a standard specification published by the ASTM for cold-formed welded and seamless carbon steel structural tubing in round, square, and rectangular shapes. It is commonly specified in the US for hollow structural sections, but the more stringent CSA G40.21 is preferred in Canada. Another related standard is ASTM A501, which is a hot-formed version of this A500. ASTM A500 defines four grades of carbon steel based primarily on material strength.

This is a standard set by the standards organization ASTM International, a voluntary standards development organization that sets technical standards for materials, products, systems, and services.

Density
Like other carbon steels, A500 and A501 steels have a specific gravity of approximately 7.85, and therefore a density of approximately 7850 kg/m3 (0.284 pounds per cubic inch).

Grades
A500 cold-formed tubing comes in four grades based on chemical composition, tensile strength, and heat treatment. The yield strength requirements are higher for square and rectangular than for round tubing. The minimum copper content is optional. Grade D must be heat treated.

Mechanical Properties

Shaped structural tubing

References

Steels
ASTM standards
Structural engineering standards